The Ministry of Defense of Transnistria  (Russian: Министерство обороны Приднестровской Молдавской Республики) is a government agency of the partially recognized Pridnestrovian Moldavian Republic. It is the executive body in implementing defense policies in of the Armed Forces of Transnistria. The current Minister of Defense is Major General Oleg Obruchlov.

Tasks 

 To implement state policy on defense and military development
 To coordinate the activities of state bodies and local self-government bodies from the preparation of the state for defense
 To ensure the combat readiness, and capability of the armed forces to perform their functions and tasks
 To interact with state bodies, public organizations and citizens, international organizations to provide training and education in the military

History 
On September 6, 1991, a year after the formation of the PMR, the Supreme Soviet adopted a decree "On measures to protect the sovereignty and independence of the republic", which determined the creation of the Republican Guard. On September 3, 1992, the Supreme Council approved a concept by the military agencies and organizations. By the end of 1992, all the main structures within the defence ministry were formed, including departments, units and subunits. On March 14, 1993, the entire staff of the defense ministry took an oath of allegiance to the country. The professional holiday of the ministry is on 6 September, days after the Republic Day celebrations.

Leadership

Minister of Defense 

The Minister of Defense is the executive minister responsible for the management of the ministry as well as the armed forces.

The following is a list of Ministers of Defence of Transnistria from 1991 – present:

 Major General Stefan Kitzac (September 1991 – September 1992)
 Colonel General Stanislav Hazheev (September 1992 – January 24, 2012)
 Major General Alexander Lukyanenko (January 24, 2012 – December 30, 2015)
 Major General Oleg Gomenyuk (December 30, 2015 – August 18, 2016)
 Major General Ruslan Paulesko (August 18, 2016 – December 26, 2016)
 Major General Oleg Obruchkov (December 26, 2016 – Present)

Chief of Staff

List of Commanders

See also 
 Armed Forces of Transnistria
 Ministry of State Security (Transnistria)
 Transnistria War
 Ministry of Internal Affairs of Transnistria

References 

Military of Transnistria